The wushu event at the 2013 World Combat Games took place at the Spartak - Sports Complex 'Arena', in Saint Petersburg, Russia. The competition took place on the 25 and 26 October 2013. There were taolu and sanshou events for male and female athletes.

Medal table
Key:

Medal summary

Men

Women

References

2013 World Combat Games
2013 World Combat Games events
2013 in wushu (sport)